Shaneh-Kuh ( meaning mount shoulder) is a mountain in the Takht-e Suleyman Massif, Alborz mountain range, north of Iran.

With an elevation of 4,465 meters, it is located between mount Alam-Kuh and Mount Takht-e Suleyman.

See also
 List of Iranian four-thousanders

References

Mountains of Iran
Four-thousanders of the Alborz
Mountains of Mazandaran Province